Olga Mærsk is a container ship, built in 2003 and operated by Mærsk Line. She is the first in the Olga Mærsk class, other Mærsk ships in the Olga Mærsk class are Olivia Mærsk, Oluf Mærsk and Gorm Mærsk.

References

Merchant ships of Denmark
Container ships
Ships of the Maersk Line
2003 ships